The Petroleum Act 1998 is an Act of the Parliament of the United Kingdom which consolidated arrangements for the licensing, operation and abandonment of offshore installations and pipelines. As a consolidation Act, it did not change the substantive law, although certain Acts were amended and repealed.

Background 
This was a consolidation Act which brought together a number of enactments on petroleum. It dealt with rights and licences to search for and get petroleum; the application of criminal and civil law to offshore activities; authorisations for submarine pipelines; and the decommissioning of offshore installations and pipelines. The main Acts which were to be consolidated were the Petroleum (Production) Act 1934; the Petroleum and Submarine Pipelines Act 1975; the Oil and Gas (Enterprise) Act 1982; and the Petroleum Act 1987, Parts I and II.

The Act vested all rights to the UK’s petroleum resources in the Crown; a right first established by the Petroleum Production Act 1934 (24 & 25 Geo. 5 c. 36). It also established the right to grant licenses to ‘search and bore for and get’ petroleum, to the Oil and Gas Authority; this was through the retrospective application of the Energy Act 2016. The Act also made provision for the abandonment of offshore installations and pipelines. The Act also puts into statute the objective of maximising the economic recovery of the UK’s offshore oil and gas resources (by means of the Infrastructure Act 2015).
The Act repealed in their entirety the Petroleum Production Act 1934 (24 & 25 Geo. 5 c. 36) and the Petroleum and Submarine Pipe-lines Act 1975. (1975 c. 74). It also amended the Petroleum Act 1987 (1987 c. 12) Parts I and II concerning the abandonment of Offshore Installations and the licensing of petroleum production.

Provisions

Part I Petroleum (sections 1 to 9)
Section 4 has further clauses on licence provisions. Section 50 of the Infrastructure Act 2015 appended this section. It defines 'associated hydraulic fracturing' as more than 1,000 cubic metres of fluid per stage, or more than 10,000 cubic metres of fluid in total. In addition, conditions were attached that mean no fracking can take place at a depth shallower than 1,000 meters, and that soil and air monitoring must be put in place. The regulations state that "The associated hydraulic fracturing will not take place within protected groundwater source areas". 'Protected groundwater source area' does not appear to be defined.

Part II Offshore activities
Section 10 applied UK criminal law to acts or omissions which takes place on, under or above an offshore installation which would constitute an offences under UK criminal law.

Section 11 applied UK civil law to acts or omissions which takes place on, under or above an offshore installation which would constitute an offences under UK civil law.

Section 12 requires in England and Wales the consent of the Director of Public Prosecutions to instigate proceedings for an offence.

Section 13 interpretation of Part II

Part III Submarine pipelines
Section 14 prohibits the construction or use of any controlled pipeline without the written authorisation by the Secretary of State.

Section 15 authorisations may contain limitations or specified conditions

Section 16 modifications to increase capacity or installation of a  junction may be specified by the Secretary of State

Section 17 a person may apply to have material conveyed by a pipeline

Section 18 authorisations may be terminated

Section 19 a pipeline which ceases to have an authorisation shall be transferred to and vested in the Secretary of State

Section 20 the Secretary of State may appoint inspectors

Section 21 specifies offences and enforcement

Section 22 criminal proceedings

Section 23 civil liability for breach of statutory duty

Section 24 application of Part III

Section 25 making of orders and regulations

Sections 26, 27 meanings of pipeline and owner

Section 28 interpretation of Part III

Part IV Abandonment of offshore installations
Section 29 Preparation of programmes

Section 30  Persons who may be required to submit programmes

Section 31  Section 29 notices: supplementary provisions

Section 32  Approval of programmes

Section 33  Failure to submit programmes

Section 34  Revision of programmes

Section 35  Withdrawal of approval

Section 36  Duty to carry out programmes

Section 37  Default in carrying out programmes

Section 38  Financial resources

Section 39  Regulations

Section 40  Offences: penalties

Section 41  Offences: general

Section 42  Validity of Secretary of State’s acts

Section 43  Notices

Section 44  Meaning of “offshore installation”

Section 45  Interpretation of Part IV

Part V Miscellaneous and General

Section 46  Northern Ireland and Isle of Man shares of petroleum revenue

Section 47  Loans for development

Section 48  Interpretation

Section 49  Transitional provisions and savings

Section 50  Consequential amendments

Section 51  Repeals and revocations

Section 52  Commencement

Section 53  Short title and extent

Subsequent legislation 
The Infrastructure Act 2015 inserted Part 1A into the Petroleum Act 1998. The Energy Act 2016 extended Part 1A.

PART 1A Maximising economic recovery of UK petroleum

Section 9A  The principal objective and the strategy

Section 9B  Exercise of certain functions of the OGA

Section 9BA  Exercise of certain functions of the Secretary of State

Section 9C  Carrying out of certain petroleum industry activities

Section 9D  Reports by the Secretary of State

Section 9E   OGA's security and resilience functions

Section 9F  Producing and revising a strategy

Section 9G  Procedure for producing and revising a strategy

Section 9H  “Upstream petroleum infrastructure” and its owners

Section 9HA  “Relevant offshore installations” and their owners

Section 9I Other interpretation

See also 

 Petroleum Act
 Oil and gas industry in the United Kingdom

References

Energy law
History of the petroleum industry in the United Kingdom
United Kingdom Acts of Parliament 1998
1998 in economics